William Sheer (1889–1933)  was a British-born American stage and film actor of the silent era.

Selected filmography
 Regeneration (1915)
 Unto Those Who Sin (1916)
 The Tides of Fate (1917)
 The Sealed Envelope (1919)
 The Divorce Trap (1919)
 Pitfalls of a Big City (1919)
 Headin' Home (1920)

References

Bibliography
 Brent E. Walker. Mack Sennett’s Fun Factory: A History and Filmography of His Studio and His Keystone and Mack Sennett Comedies, with Biographies of Players and Personnel. McFarland, 2013.

External links

1889 births
1933 deaths
British male film actors
American male film actors
People from Birmingham, West Midlands
British emigrants to the United States